Xenothictis dagnyana is a species of moth of the family Tortricidae. It is found in New Caledonia.

The wingspan is about 29 mm. The forewings are cinnamon, dotted with brown. The hindwings are cream grey with dense darker strigulation.

Etymology
The species name refers to Mount Dagny, the type locality.

References

Moths described in 2013
Archipini